Grata recordatio ('With joyful recollection') was the third encyclical issued by Pope John XXIII, and was issued on 26 September 1959. It urges the use of the Rosary in the month of October following the tradition to do so by Pope Leo XIII.

See also
 List of encyclicals of Pope John XXIII

References

text on Vatican website.

Papal encyclicals
Works by Pope John XXIII
1959 documents
1959 in Christianity
September 1959 events